The Chilonzor Line  was the first line of the Tashkent Metro, opened in 1977 it connected the southern districts of the city with the centre, and then in 1980 extended westwards.

Timeline

Name changes

Transfers

References

Tashkent Metro lines
Railway lines opened in 1977
1977 establishments in the Soviet Union